Oleg Andronic (born 6 February 1989) is a Moldovan footballer who plays as a forward.

Career

Club 
He made his debut on 16 March 2008 against Olimpia Bălţi and scored his first goal from a penalty in the same match. On 9 July 2009, he scored his first international goal against Okzhetpes for an outstanding 2–0 after a 1–2 home loss in the first qualifying round of the 2009–10 UEFA Europa League. Andronic left in December 2011 Zimbru Chișinău and joined on 21 February 2012 to Academia Chișinău.

International 
Andronic played in 2008 two international friendly games for the Moldova national football team. His debut occurred in the Estonia Tournament 2008 on 18 November against Estonia national football team and his second cap was earned against Lithuania national football team, both in the A. Le Coq Arena in Tallinn.

Personal life 
His uncle Mihai is coach in Moldova, his elder brother is the Moldovan national player Gheorghe Andronic, his younger brother Gicu plays by FC Zimbru-2 Chișinău and his cousins Valeriu Andronic and Igor Andronic, are former members of the nationalside of Moldova.

References

External links
 
 

1989 births
Living people
Footballers from Chișinău
Moldovan footballers
Moldova international footballers
FC Zimbru Chișinău players
FC Academia Chișinău players
FC Speranța Crihana Veche players
FK Khujand players
FC Dinamo-Auto Tiraspol players
FC Costuleni players
Speranța Nisporeni players
FC Dacia Chișinău players
FC Milsami Orhei players
FC Ungheni players
Moldovan Super Liga players
Tajikistan Higher League players
Moldovan expatriate footballers
Expatriate footballers in Tajikistan
Association football forwards